Joaquín Sinforiano de Jesús Crespo Torres (22 August 1841 – 16 April 1898) was a Venezuelan military officer and politician. A member of the Great Liberal Party of Venezuela, he served as the president of Venezuela from 1884 to 1886 and again from 1892 to 1898. He began his career as a soldier during the Federal War.

Presidency 
Joaquín Crespo became president for the first time in 1884. In 1886 Guzmán Blanco returned as president. Crespo went into exile during the presidency of Juan Pablo Rojas Paúl which marked a break with Guzmán Blanco's policies.

During the second Joaquín Crespo regime, which began in 1892, a new constitution increased the presidential term.
The Venezuelan crisis of 1895 saw Venezuela's longstanding dispute with Great Britain about the territory of Guayana Esequiba come to a head with the USA giving diplomatic support to Venezuela. Britain claimed the territory as part of British Guiana while Venezuela saw it as Venezuelan. The disputed border was submitted to international arbitration. The arbitral panel awarded most of the territory to Britain in 1899 after Crespo's death.

Subsequent career 
In 1897, Crespo did not campaign for a third presidential term but supported Ignacio Andrade against key opponent Jose Manuel Hernandez. Andrade won the election and inaugurated his term on 28 February, 1898 . Hernandez decried the results as fraudulent and took up arms. Hernandez was quickly defeated, with resultant political turmoil.

Death 
Crespo, who remained a military mainstay of the government, was killed in battle on 16 April 1898 in the Combat of Mata Carmelera while defending the government of Andrade.

He was buried in the Southern General Cemetery. During the crisis in Venezuela, in 2018, the tomb of Crespo and his wife Jacinta was looted and vandalized, leaving their bodies exposed to the elements.

Personal life
Crespo was married to Jacinta Parejo, who served as First Lady of Venezuela from 1884 to 1886, and 1892–1898.

See also
Presidents of Venezuela
List of presidents of Venezuela

References

External links
 

People from Aragua
Presidents of Venezuela
Venezuelan soldiers
1841 births
1898 deaths
Burials in Venezuela
Great Liberal Party of Venezuela politicians
Venezuelan people of Spanish descent